Jackson-Reed High School (founded as Woodrow Wilson High School) is a public high school in Washington, D.C. It serves grades 9 through 12 as part of the District of Columbia Public Schools. The school sits in the Tenleytown neighborhood, at the intersection of Chesapeake Street and Nebraska Avenue NW. It primarily serves students in Washington's Ward 3, but nearly 30% of the student body lives outside the school's boundaries.

Opened in 1935, the school was originally named for Woodrow Wilson, the 28th president of the United States. It was renamed in 2022 for Edna Burke Jackson, the school's first African American teacher, and Vincent Reed, a former principal. The school building was added to the National Register of Historic Places in 2010 and extensively renovated in 2010–2011.

The school's motto, "Haec olim meminisse juvabit," is a Latin phrase from Virgil's Aeneid; after a storm, Aeneas tells his men that "In days to come, it will please us to remember this."

History

Early years

What is now Jackson-Reed High School was built on a patch of land acquired in 1930, known by the neighboring Tenleytowners as "French's Woods". In March 1934, the D.C. commissioners awarded the contract to build the school to the lowest bidder: McCloskey and Co. of Philadelphia. It was built for a total cost of $1.25 million.

The school opened its doors to students on September 23, 1935, as an all-white school named for Woodrow Wilson, the 28th president of the United States, the sixth DC Interhigh school. The school started with 640 sophomores and juniors, many of whom had transferred from Central and Western. Western had been running double shifts (9 a.m. to 5 p.m.) to accommodate the students from the Wilson neighborhoods. The first principal was Norman J. Nelson, formerly assistant principal at Western.

Wilson High School graduated its first students in February 1937. Chester Moye was class president of the February graduation class. The school held its first spring commencement exercises, on June 23, 1937, for 290 students. The class president was Robert Davidson.

Subsequent years
In the spring of 1970, about 400 students, almost all black, gathered in the school auditorium to protest inequalities in the school. Jay Childers, the author of The Evolving Citizen: American Youth and the Changing Norms of Democratic Engagement (2012), wrote that this indicated racial tension in the school.

Stephen P. Tarason became the school's 11th principal in January 1999, when he succeeded Wilma Bonner. Bonner spent a brief time working at the main DCPS office before accepting a job at Howard University School of Education.

In mid-2006, Woodrow Wilson High School was proposed to be a charter school. However, the superintendent asked the school to hold off in exchange for being granted control over certain areas of autonomy, especially facilities.

Jacqueline Williams became interim principal in 2007, after Tarason left to become a middle school principal in Hagerstown, Maryland. The following year, DCPS chancellor Michelle Rhee appointed as principal Peter Cahall, a former teacher and administrator with the Montgomery County Public Schools.

The school building was added to the National Register of Historic Places in 2010.

For the 2006-07 school year, Woodrow Wilson was one of 11 U.S. schools selected by the College Board for the EXCELerator School Improvement Model program, which was funded by the Bill & Melinda Gates Foundation.

2010s
Along with several other D.C. public schools, the campus was renovated in 2011, bringing it to the LEED Gold standard. For the 2010–11 school year, Wilson held classes in a temporary space at the University of the District of Columbia. The renovated school reopened in October, and festivities included a 75th anniversary celebration.

Childers wrote that the school had been "increasingly troubled" before 2012.

In June 2014, Cahall came out as gay to his students during the school's gay pride day. He said that his students inspired him to come out. The Westboro Baptist Church had stated that it was going to protest against that pride day.

Cahall left his post in December 2014, in the middle of the school year, after DCPS announced that his contract would not be renewed. Cahall said that his contract was not renewed due to low test scores. In 2015, Cahall became the principal of Thomas Edison High School of Technology.

In spring 2015, a panel headed by teachers and other employees, parents, and members of the surrounding community examined candidates for the position of principal. DCPS ultimately hired Kimberly Martin, who had served as the principal of Lorain Admiral King High School in Lorain, Ohio, from 2003 to 2005, after teaching there for five years; as principal of Thomas W. Harvey High School in Painesville, Ohio, from 2005 to 2012; and as principal of Aspen High School in Aspen, Colorado, from 2012 to 2015.  She began her term as principal of Wilson on June 29, 2015.

In 2015, DCPS proposed a $15.6 million budget for Wilson, down $300,000 from the previous year, despite a projected enrollment of more students.

2020s: new name 
The 21st century brought sporadic discussions about whether Woodrow Wilson was an appropriate namesake for a high school. Wilson supported segregation, and his works as a historian are pillars of the Dunning School approach to the Civil War and Reconstruction. His presidency was part of what is known as the nadir of American race relations. As U.S. president, he began or allowed segregation and purges among federal workers, including in the U.S. military.  

Such discussions gained traction in 2015, when Princeton University students argued for removing Wilson's name from campus buildings. Some suggested that the high school be renamed to honor Reno, a black community demolished in the 1930s to create Fort Reno Park, because Wilson's policies, particularly his segregation of the federal workforce, laid the groundwork for dismantling it. Proponents of changing the name argued, as the Washington Post put it in 2019, that "the community in Northwest Washington has to acknowledge that the federal government — after Wilson left office — uprooted established black communities to create the upper-income, largely white enclave it is today." 

On September 15, 2020, D.C. Public Schools officials announced the school would change its name by the end of 2020, at an estimated cost of $1.2 million. After a citywide call for nominations drew more than 2,000 submissions, the Mayor settled on nine finalists and put the list to a community vote. By far the largest chunk of the vote, more than 30 percent, went to August Wilson, the African American playwright. The DCPS leaders and the Mayor's office expressed support, so the school planned to rename itself August Wilson High School in fall 2021. But the Mayor and DC Council failed to act on the name change formally. The class of 2021 graduated with the simplified name "Wilson High School" on their diplomas.

On December 20, 2021, the D.C. Council voiced opposition to the proposed new name, and voted instead to name the school Jackson-Reed High School, after Edna Burke Jackson, the first African American teacher at Wilson High School; and Vincent Reed, an African American principal who became D.C. Public Schools superintendent. Bowser did not formally respond to the D.C. Council's actions, which was passed with a veto-proof majority. The bill was transmitted for Congressional review under the Home Rule Charter without incident, and became law on March 15, 2022.

Admissions

Demographics 
As of 2021, Jackson-Reed serves 1,951 students. Jackson-Reed is the largest comprehensive public high school in the District.

The Beacon, the school newspaper, described the school as "an integrated school, an unusual, precious, fragile organism, attacked from many sides" in December 1970.

In 1955, 99% of the students at Wilson were white, and by the late 1960s, the school was still predominately white. A racial integration campaign occurred in the late 1960s and early 1970s. The school was 17% white by 1980. By 2012, there had been a decline in students from wealthier families; by then, many alternative options for schooling had appeared in the DCPS system.

The demographic breakdown by race/ethnicity of the 1,796 students enrolled for the 2018–2019 school year was:

Attendance boundary 
Jackson-Reed primarily serves students in Ward 3. School boundaries encompass everything west of 16th Street, NW; all of southwest Washington north of the Anacostia River; and parts of Capitol Hill southeast. Neighborhoods include Adams Morgan, Georgetown, Glover Park, Chevy Chase, and Tenleytown.

The following elementary schools feed into Jackson-Reed:
 Bancroft Elementary School
 Eaton Elementary School
 Hearst Elementary School
 Hyde-Addison Elementary School
 Janney Elementary School
 Key Elementary School
 Lafayette Elementary School
 Mann Elementary School
 Murch Elementary School
 Oyster-Adams Bilingual School
 Shepherd Elementary School
 Stoddert Elementary School
The following middle schools feed into Jackson-Reed:
 Deal Middle School
 Hardy Middle School
 Oyster-Adams Bilingual School
However, nearly 30% of the student body lives outside the school's boundaries. Those students come from all parts of the District. In all, students come to Jackson-Reed from 40 different schools in the city.

Many of the students live in poor neighborhoods near the school. Tenleytown, the neighborhood surrounding Jackson-Reed has a median family income of over $80,000 as of 2012.

The school's student body is ethnically mixed: 32% African American, 34% Caucasian, 22% Latin American, and 6% Asian American.

Nearly 22% of the students receive free and reduced lunch benefits.

Curriculum 
Students are required to complete 24 credits for graduation, including courses in Art, English, Health and Physical Education, Mathematics through Calculus, Music, Science, Social Studies, and World Languages.

Many Jackson-Reed students enroll in advanced courses; as of 2015 Jackson-Reed has one of the largest numbers of Advanced Placement courses and electives in DCPS. In the 2012–2013 school year, Jackson-Reed had a 50% rate of scoring 3–5 in Advanced Placement courses

Many Jackson-Reed students, about 55% of the student body in the 2013–2014 school year, are members of "academies" that seek to tailor a student's curriculum to his or her academic or professional interests. These include the Finance Academy, HAM (Humanities, Arts, and Media), WISP (Wilson International Studies Program), JROTC, Hospitality and Tourism, AAA (Academic Athletic Achievement), and SciMaTech (Science, Math, and Technology).

Extracurricular activities

Athletics 

During its first school year in 1935–36, the then-Wilson HS was not eligible to play in the Inter-High School Athletic Association. The newly formed basketball and baseball teams played an exhibition-only schedule the first year, and there was no football team. The basketball and baseball teams began their official Inter-High Series competition in the 1936–'37 school year. The football team played an exhibition season in 1936–37 and then officially joined the Inter-High Series a year later,  in the fall of 1937.

Wilson was frequently called "the Presidents" by newspaper sportswriters in the early years.

Baseball 

By 2008, the Tigers had won sixteen consecutive DCIAA baseball championships.

Through their 2011 season, the Wilson baseball program won nineteen consecutive DCIAA championships.

Other sports 

The Wilson boys' ultimate frisbee team is currently ranked eighth in the country and the girls' team 17th, according to Ultiworld magazine as of April 5, 2019.

The Tigers athletic program maintains the only crew team among D.C. public high schools.

The Wilson varsity softball won the DCIAA championship for the three consecutive years in 2007, 2008, and 2009. In 2009 the team, led by seniors Kathleen McLain and Rachel Bitting, played Georgetown Visitation in the Congressional Bank Softball Classic in which the softball champion of the DC public schools played the champion of the DC private schools. Wilson won the game, 3–2.

Publications
Jackson-Reed's school newspaper is called The Beacon. It began publication in 1935.

In 2012 Jay Childers wrote that the quality of the publication and the publishing frequency of the Beacon declined as the school had increased difficulties. Historically, the school administration did not, and still does not, review  Beacon articles before publication, even though the U.S. Supreme Court in Hazelwood v. Kuhlmeier stated that principals have the right to have control over newspaper content. In August 2015, Principal Kimberly Martin announced that the newspaper would be required to allow her and her staff to review all articles before publication. This led to protests from students, including a Change.org petition. The newspaper staff criticized and stated opposition to the proposal. By September, Martin and the co-editors agreed to end the prior review plan. Martin had canceled publishing a newspaper article at her previous school in Colorado.

Students also publish an annual literary magazine called L.A.V.A..

Campus 

The campus includes an Olympic-sized swimming pool, theater space, and a large atrium. There is a turf football field behind the school, surrounded by a running track closer to 350 meters than the standard 400.

Athletic facilities 
Jackson-Reed Stadium opened for duty in 1939. An artificial turf field was installed over the summer of 2007. A sound system, press box, and lights were also added to the stadium. The stadium is now used for several sports, including soccer, football, and lacrosse.

There has been an aquatic facility on the high school's campus since the late 1970s. It first opened in 1978 but was condemned and demolished in 2007. A new Aquatic Center for Ward 3 was completed in 2009, with an indoor 50-meter swimming pool, a children's pool, and other facilities.

Awards and recognition 
In April 2013, Jackson-Reed was named as a Green Ribbon School by the U.S. Department of Education in recognition for "being good stewards of the environment."

Notable alumni 

Notable alumni of Jackson-Reed High School include:

References

External links

National Register of Historic Places in Washington, D.C.
Buildings and structures completed in 1935
District of Columbia Public Schools
Public high schools in Washington, D.C.
Colonial Revival architecture in Washington, D.C.
School buildings completed in 1935
Lacrosse venues in Washington, D.C.
Swimming venues in Washington, D.C.
Wrestling venues in Washington, D.C.
Tenleytown